Mauro Matías Mallorca (born 25 April 1996) is an Argentine professional footballer who plays as an attacking midfielder.

Career
Mallorca began in the youth ranks of Temperley, prior to being signed by River Plate in 2012. He never made the first-team of River Plate, departing in 2015 and subsequently joining Cambaceres of Primera C Metropolitana. He scored six goals in forty-three appearances over two seasons with Cambaceres. In August 2017, Mallorca joined Primera B Metropolitana side Fénix. He made his professional debut on 2 September versus Tristán Suárez, which was one of four appearances in 2017–18. He left midway through 2017–18 to play for JJ Urquiza in Primera C Metropolitana; departing after eight games.

After leaving JJ Urquiza, Mallorca had a four-month stint in Mexican football with fourth tier side Gavilanes de Matamoros before spending five months with Liga Mendocina team Gutiérrez SC.

Personal life
In June 2020, during the COVID-19 pandemic, Mallorca appealed on social media for blood donations after his mother was put into intensive care after contracting the virus.

Career statistics
.

References

External links

1996 births
Living people
People from Temperley
Argentine footballers
Association football midfielders
Argentine expatriate footballers
Expatriate footballers in Mexico
Argentine expatriate sportspeople in Mexico
Primera C Metropolitana players
Primera B Metropolitana players
Defensores de Cambaceres footballers
Club Atlético Fénix players
Asociación Social y Deportiva Justo José de Urquiza players
Sportspeople from Buenos Aires Province